Carrozzeria Marazzi was an Italian coachbuilding company founded in 1967 and is located in Caronno Pertusella, in the province of Varese, Lombardy.

The company was established by Carlo Marazzi (with sons Serafino and Mario) and employees from the then bankrupt Carrozzeria Touring of Milan. Marazzi first completed the Lamborghini 400GT 2+2 series, which was followed by a series of 125 Lamborghini Islero (1967), and the first few of the Lamborghini Jarama (1970).
Next came the eighteen Alfa Romeo 33 Stradale (1967), a few Alfa Romeo Giulia Nuova Promiscua (1973), two Alfa Romeo 90 station wagon prototypes (designed for the Auto Capital magazine in 1985) and a Fiat Punto Cabrio Wagon Bricò prototype (1994). Marazzi also made various hearses, based on Mercedes-Benz through the 1990s. Marazzi's final works included cars such as the Alfa Romeo 8C Competizione Spider prototype and a Land Rover Discovery 3, armored for police use.

The company was liquidated in 2019.

See also 

 Carrozzeria Touring

References

External links
 Carrozzeria Marazzi web page
 Coachbuild.com FORUM: Carrozzeria Marazzi

Marazzi
Milan motor companies
Vehicle manufacturing companies established in 1967
Italian companies established in 1967
Caronno Pertusella